Senator Cleveland may refer to:

Annette Cleveland (fl. 2010s), Washington State Senate
Benjamin Cleveland (1738–1806), North Carolina State Senate
Bill Cleveland (1902–1974), Louisiana State Senate
James Colgate Cleveland (1920–1995), New Hampshire State Senate
Jesse Franklin Cleveland (1804–1841), Georgia State Senate
John Cleveland (politician) (born 1950), Maine State Senate
Mack Cleveland (1924–2010), Florida State Senate